Kathleen Williams may refer to:

Kathleen M. Williams (born 1956), U.S. federal judge
Kathleen Williams (gymnast) (born 1964), British Olympic gymnast
Kathleen Williams (politician) (born 1961), Montana politician
Kathleen Williams (theologian), Australian Sister of Mercy and theologian